Tan Feihu (born 1 January 1987 in Hunan) is a male Chinese water polo player who was part of the gold medal winning team at the 2006 Asian Games. He competed at the 2008 Summer Olympics.

References
 profile

1987 births
Living people
Chinese male water polo players
Olympic water polo players of China
Water polo players at the 2008 Summer Olympics
Sportspeople from Hunan
Asian Games medalists in water polo
Water polo players at the 2006 Asian Games
Water polo players at the 2010 Asian Games
Water polo players at the 2014 Asian Games
Medalists at the 2006 Asian Games
Medalists at the 2010 Asian Games
Medalists at the 2014 Asian Games
Asian Games gold medalists for China
Asian Games silver medalists for China
Asian Games bronze medalists for China
21st-century Chinese people